The 2013 Roma Open was a professional tennis tournament played on clay courts. It was the twelfth edition of the tournament which was part of the 2013 ATP Challenger Tour. It took place in Rome, Italy between 6 and 12 May 2013.

Singles main draw entrants

Seeds

 1 Rankings are as of April 29, 2013.

Other entrants
The following players received wildcards into the singles main draw:
  Eduardo Schwank
  Potito Starace
  Matteo Trevisan

The following players received entry as a special exempt into the singles main draw:
  David Guez

The following players received entry from the qualifying draw:
  Andrey Golubev
  Andrej Martin
  Adrián Menéndez Maceiras
  Maxime Teixeira

The following players received entry as lucky losers:
  Dustin Brown
  Bastian Knittel
  Denys Mylokostov

Doubles main draw entrants

Seeds

1 Rankings as of April 29, 2013.

Other entrants
The following pairs received wildcards into the doubles main draw:
  Daniele Giorgini /  Walter Trusendi

The following pair received entry using a protected ranking:
  Andreas Beck /  Ken Skupski

The following pair received entry as an alternate into the doubles main draw:
  Adrián Menéndez Maceiras /  Adrian Ungur

Champions

Singles

 Aljaž Bedene def.  Filippo Volandri, 6–4, 6–2

Doubles

 Andre Begemann /  Martin Emmrich def.  Philipp Marx /  Florin Mergea, 7–6(7–4), 6–3

External links
Official Website

Roma Open
Roma Open